Soret may refer to:

Persons
 Charles Soret (1854–1904), a chemist, and son of Jacques-Louis Soret
Thermophoresis, also known (particularly in liquid mixtures) as the Soret effect, named for him
 Frédéric Soret (1795–1865), a physicist and numismatist
 Jacques-Louis Soret (1827–1890), a chemist, and father of Charles Soret
the Soret peak, a spectroscopic phenomenon named for him
 Julien Soret, French governor of Senegal (1837–1839)
 Nicolas Soret, 17th-century playwright

Locations
Fontaine-la-Soret, a commune in France